Filmworks XXII: The Last Supper is a score by American composer John Zorn for Arno Bouchard's 2009 short science fiction/art film The Last Supper.

Reception

Allmusic said  "Using what are likely the very first instruments used by human beings--that is, voices and percussion--Zorn weaves a spell that evokes medieval music, ethnic ritual, and avant-garde explorations of pure sound".

Track listing
All compositions by John Zorn
 "Somnambulisme" - 2:12
 "Opening Invocation" - 2:13
 "Virgin Sacrifice" - 3:25
 "Vespers" - 3:37
 "Spiral" - 3:17
 "The Last Supper" - 1:55
 "The Colors of Blood" - 2:47
 "Sexaltation" - 2:35
 "Dance for the Vernal Equinox" - 1:35
 "Tarot" - 1:43
 "Time Travel" - 2:27
 "Le Diable" - 2:01
 "Exhaltation" - 2:01
 "Futur Primitif" - 5:34
 "Blood Ritual" - 2:39
 "In Alium" - 6:29
All compositions by John Zorn

Personnel
Cyro Baptista: percussion
Lisa Bielawa, Caleb Burhans, Martha Cluver, Abby Fischer, Kirsten Sollek: voices
John Zorn: percussion

References

External links
 
 thelastsupper.fr (flash only)

Tzadik Records soundtracks
Albums produced by John Zorn
John Zorn soundtracks
2008 soundtrack albums
Film scores